Hated is a 2012 American film directed by Lee Madsen and starring Genevieve Padalecki, Matthew Hutchinson and Ellen Woglom.

Overview
When a young punk rock band starts out in the underground music scene, the only thing they have is each other. But when a childhood friend - with complicated connections to the group - leverages her P.R. skills to get them noticed, they suddenly find themselves on the verge of making it big. The only question is how far they're willing to go in the pursuit of fame and fortune, and who they're willing to leave behind to get there. HATED explores the dark, smoke-filled corners where human nature and the contemporary music industry meet.

References

External links

2012 films
American independent films
Films about music and musicians
2012 drama films
2012 independent films
American drama films
2010s English-language films
2010s American films